Tipula pacifica is a species of large crane fly in the family Tipulidae.

References

Tipulidae
Articles created by Qbugbot
Insects described in 1912